FK Ljuboten is a football club based in Tetovo, North Macedonia. They are recently competing in the Macedonian Third League (West Division).

History
Founded in 1919, FK Ljuboten is the oldest club in North Macedonia. FK Ljuboten was based in northern Tetovo, built and supported by the locals. The name was derived from the mountain peak of the Šar Mountains, Ljuboten. Through most of the football period under both the Kingdom and Socialist Yugoslavia, the club relied on local talent and were funded by the locals and the city of Tetovo.
For the 100th birthday of the club, they joined the Club of Pioneers.

Rivalry
FK Ljuboten's rival is FK Teteks. The rivalry reflected the social and class differences of the respective club's supporters. Ljuboten's supporters are only the citizens of Tetovo, predominantly of Macedonians. Teteks supporters were the working class, as the club was founded by the Teteks company and had supporters from Macedonians in Tetovo and all around North Macedonia.

Honours
Macedonian Second League:
Winners (1): 1992–93

Current squad

Recent seasons 

1The 2019–20 and 2020–21 seasons were abandoned due to the COVID-19 pandemic in North Macedonia.

References

External links
FK Ljuboten Blog 
FK Ljuboten Facebook 
Club info at MacedonianFootball 
Football Federation of Macedonia 

FK Ljuboten
Football clubs in North Macedonia
Association football clubs established in 1919
FK Ljuboten